This article is about the climate change policy of the United States under the George W. Bush administration.

Kyoto Protocol

In March 2001, the Bush Administration announced that it would not implement the Kyoto Protocol, an international treaty signed in 1997 in Kyoto, Japan that would require nations to reduce their greenhouse gas emissions, claiming that ratifying the treaty would create economic setbacks in the U.S. and does not put enough pressure to limit emissions from developing nations.  In February 2002, Bush announced his alternative to the Kyoto Protocol, by bringing forth a plan to reduce the intensity of greenhouse gases by 18 percent over 10 years. The intensity of greenhouse gases specifically is the ratio of greenhouse gas emissions and economic output, meaning that under this plan, emissions would still continue to grow, but at a slower pace. Bush stated that this plan would prevent the release of 500 million metric tons of greenhouse gases, which is about the equivalent of 70 million cars from the road. This target would achieve this goal by providing tax credits to businesses that use renewable energy sources.

Influence of industry groups

In June 2005, US State Department papers showed the Bush administration thanking Exxon executives for the company's "active involvement" in helping to determine climate change policy, including the U.S. stance on Kyoto. Input from the business lobby group Global Climate Coalition was also a factor.

The Bush administration implemented an industry-formulated disinformation campaign designed to actively mislead the American public on global warming and to forestall limits on "climate polluters," according to a report in Rolling Stone magazine which reviews hundreds of internal government documents and former government officials.

"'They've got a political clientele that does not want to be regulated,' says Rick S. Piltz, a former Bush climate official who blew the whistle on White House censorship of global-warming documents in 2005. 'Any honest discussion of the science would stimulate public pressure for a stronger policy. They're not stupid.'

Bush's do-nothing policy on global warming began almost as soon as he took office. By pursuing a carefully orchestrated policy of delay, the White House blocked even the most modest reforms and replaced them with token investments in futuristic solutions like hydrogen cars. 'It's a charade,' says Jeremy Symons, who represented the EPA on Dick Cheney's energy task force, the industry-studded group that met in secret to craft the administration's energy policy. 'They have a single-minded determination to do nothing—while making it look like they are doing something.' . . .

The CEQ became Cheney's shadow EPA, with industry calling the shots. To head up the council, Cheney installed James Connaughton, a former lobbyist for industrial polluters, who once worked to help General Electric and ARCO skirt responsibility for their Superfund waste sites.

...two weeks after Bush took office - ExxonMobil's top lobbyist, Randy Randol, demanded a housecleaning of the scientists in charge of studying global warming. . .

...Exxon's wish was the CEQ's command.

Political pressure on scientists

Also according to testimony taken by the U.S. House of Representatives, the Bush White House pressured American scientists to suppress discussion of global warming.

"High-quality science" was "struggling to get out," as the Bush administration pressured scientists to tailor their writings on global warming to fit the Bush administration's skepticism, in some cases at the behest of an ex-oil industry lobbyist. "Nearly half of all respondents perceived or personally experienced pressure to eliminate the words 'climate change,' 'global warming' or other similar terms from a variety of communications."

Similarly, according to the testimony of senior officers of the Government Accountability Project, the White House attempted to bury the report "National Assessment of the Potential Consequences of Climate Variability and Change," produced by U.S. scientists pursuant to U.S. law. Some U.S. scientists resigned their jobs rather than give in to White House pressure to underreport global warming.

Also, the White House removed key portions of a Centers for Disease Control and Prevention (CDC) report given to the U.S. Senate Environment and Public Works Committee about the dangers to human health of global warming. According to one CDC official familiar with both the CDC version and the version given to the Senate, the version given to the Senate was "eviscerated." The White House prevented the Senate and thus the public from receiving key CDC estimates in the report about diseases likely to flourish in a warmer climate, increased injuries and deaths from severe weather such as hurricanes, more respiratory problems from drought-driven air pollution, an increase in waterborne diseases including cholera, increases in vector-borne diseases including malaria and hantavirus, mental health problems such as depression and post-traumatic stress, and how many people might be adversely affected because of increased warming.

US officials, such as Philip Cooney, have repeatedly edited scientific reports from US government scientists,
 many of whom, such as Thomas Knutson, have been ordered to refrain from discussing climate change and related topics.

Climate scientist James E. Hansen, director of NASA's Goddard Institute for Space Studies, claimed in a widely cited New York Times article

in 2006 that his superiors at the agency were trying to "censor" information "going out to the public." NASA denied this, saying that it was merely requiring that scientists make a distinction between personal, and official government, views in interviews conducted as part of work done at the agency. Several scientists working at the National Oceanic and Atmospheric Administration have made similar complaints;  once again, government officials said they were enforcing long-standing policies requiring government scientists to clearly identify personal opinions as such when participating in public interviews and forums.

In 2006, the BBC's long-running current affairs series Panorama investigated the issue, and was told that "scientific reports about global warming have been systematically changed and suppressed."

According to an Associated Press release on January 30, 2007,

...climate scientists at seven government agencies say they have been subjected to political pressure aimed at downplaying the threat of global warming.

The groups presented a survey that shows two in five of the 279 climate scientists who responded to a questionnaire complained that some of their scientific papers had been edited in a way that changed their meaning. Nearly half of the 279 said in response to another question that at some point they had been told to delete reference to "global warming" or "climate change" from a report.

Critics writing in the Wall Street Journal editorial page claim that the survey

was itself unscientific.

Attempts to suppress scientific information on global warming and other issues have been described by Chris Mooney as constituting a Republican War on Science.

Attempts to undermine U.S. and state efforts

The Bush Administration worked to undermine state efforts to mitigate global warming. Mary Peters, the Transportation Secretary at that time, personally directed US efforts to urge governors and dozens of members of the House of Representatives to block California's first-in-the-nation limits on greenhouse gases from cars and trucks, according to e-mails obtained by Congress.

See also
Climate change in the United States
Politics of the United States

References

Climate change policy in the United States
United States federal policy
Presidency of George W. Bush
Bush, George W.